The 2010 Men's European Volleyball League was the seventh edition of the annual Men's European Volleyball League, which featured men's national volleyball teams from eight European countries: Austria, Great Britain, Greece, Portugal, Romania, Slovakia, Spain, and Turkey. A preliminary league round was played from June 4 to July 11, and the final four tournament was held at the Polideportivo Aguas Vivas hall, in Guadalajara, Spain, on July 16 and 17.

During the league round, competing nations were drawn into two pools of four teams, and played each other in a double round-robin system, with two matches per leg in a total of six legs. Pool winners and the best runner-up would qualify for the final four round, joining the host team. If the final four host team finished first in its league round pool, both pool runners-up would qualify for the final four. Spain and Portugal won pool A and B, respectively, and Romania and Turkey qualified as runners-up.

In the final four tournament, the semi-final matches featured Portugal and Spain defeating Romania (3–2) and Turkey (3–0), respectively, to produce a rematch of the 2007 final. Portugal overturned a 1–0 Spanish lead to win 3–1 and secure its first European League title. As winner of the 2010 European League, Portugal will compete in the FIVB World League 2011 Qualification tournament.

Teams

League round

Pool A

|}

Leg 1

|}

Leg 2

|}

Leg 3

|}

Leg 4

|}

Leg 5

|}

Leg 6

|}

Pool B

|}

Leg 1

|}

Leg 2

|}

Leg 3

|}

Leg 4

|}

Leg 5

|}

Leg 6

|}

Final four
The final four tournament was held at the Polideportivo Aguas Vivas sports hall in Guadalajara, Spain, on July 16 and July 17, 2010.

Semifinals

|}

Bronze medal match

|}

Final

|}

Final standing

Awards

Most Valuable Player
  Valdir Sequeira
Best Scorer
  Serhat Coskun
Best Spiker
  João José
Best Blocker
  João Malveiro

Best Server
  Jose Subiela
Best Setter
  Guillermo Hérnan
Best Receiver
  André Lopes
Best Libero
  Francesc Llenas

References

External links
 Official website

European Volleyball League
E
V
International volleyball competitions hosted by Spain